John (Ivan) Boris Balinsky (July 4, 1934 in Kyiv, Ukrainian SSR – October 1, 1983 in Ames, Iowa, Iowa, United States) - South African and American zoologist of Ukrainian origin.  His father Boris Balinsky was an embryologist.

Life 
Balinsky was born in Kyiv into a family of biologists; his father was university professor Boris Balinsky and his mother, Catherine Singaiivska, was a laboratory researcher. His mother died after return from a Soviet prison during World War II.

Science 
Balinsky studied amphibian physiology. He investigated cell environmental adaptation regulation  during development. Authored 47 research publications, including «Comparative Biochemistry of Nitrogen Metabolism» chapter.

Also described several species of Echinodermata:
 Ophiactis delagoa JB Balinsky, 1957 
 Macrophiothrix mossambica JB Balinsky, 1957
 Amphiura inhacensis JB Balinsky, 1957

Awards and grants 
 Witwatersrand Council of Education Overseas Scholarship (1956)
 Nuffield Foundation in dominions (1962)
 Carnegie Corporation of New York (1967) 
 U. S. National Institutes of Health International Fellowship (1968)
 South African Council for the scientific and Industrial Research Senior Bursary (1975)
 Harry Oppenheimer Fellowship Award (1975)

Science organization membership 
 AAAS
 Biochemical Society
 Royal Society of South Africa
 Physiological Society of Southern Africa
 Society for Endocrinology, Metabolism and Diabetes of Southern Africa
Vice chairman (1974-1975) for the South African Biochemical Society and the chairman (1973-1974) of the Society for Experimental Biology, Transvaal.

Sources 

 

American zoologists
American biochemists
South African biologists
Soviet emigrants to South Africa
Scientists from Johannesburg
Scientists from Kyiv
1934 births
1983 deaths
20th-century South African zoologists
South African emigrants to the United States